The 6th AEAUSA was held at New Jersey on December 20, 2020 with no live audience due to the ongoing COVID-19 pandemic. The ceremony was broadcast live on AEAUSA YouTube channel. Nominees were revealed on October 9, 2020. The ceremony seeks to reward excellence in entrepreneurship, community leadership, and the entrainment industry in Africa and the diaspora. 

The ceremony was sponsored by Empak Corp, and Siderz Entertainment LLC.

Performers

Artist
 Maua Sama
 KG
 Jahllano
 Tinashe Mukasa
 Mando
 Connell Thompson
 Manamba Kanté
 Dub Afrika
 Jamaal Hoggard
 Lil Ommy
 TY Vybz
 Nandy
 Ms. Bodega
 Afro Afrique
 Morachi

Presenters
 Nkechi Blessing Sunday
 Seun Sean Jimoh
 Dr. Nelson Aluya MD
 Lwanga Douglas
 II Kaya Ises
 Osita F. Ugeh
 Tina Johnson

Nominations and winners
The following is a list of nominees and the winners are listed highlighted in boldface.

Note
 This year's award introduced a new category named the Best New Artist. Laycon fans took to Twitter to celebrate his win, as being the first to be awarded the Best New Artist.

References

External links
AEAUSA YouTube Channel
AEAUSA 

2020 music awards
2020 awards
2020 awards in the United States